William Weston  may refer to:

Politicians
William Weston I (c.1351–c.1419), MP for Surrey 1380–1419
William Weston II, MP for Sussex in 1415
William Weston III, MP for Guildford 1415, 1419, 1423 and 1431, and for Surrey 1447
William Weston (c. 1546–1594), MP for Weymouth and Melcombe Regis in 1593
William Weston (Australian politician) (1804–1888), third Premier of Tasmania
 William Weston (Vermont politician) (1803-1875), member of the Vermont Senate

Others
William Weston (billiards) (1847–1935) billiard player
William Weston (engineer) (1763–1833), canal engineer
William Weston (explorer) (circa 1445 – 1504/5), English merchant and explorer
William Weston (footballer) (1882–1948), English soccer player
William Weston (Jesuit) (c. 1550–1615), English Jesuit
Sir William Weston (prior) (died 1540), English prior of the knights of St. John
William Basil Weston (1924–1945), British Army officer, awarded the Victoria Cross
William C. Weston (1886–1932), New Zealand-born architect (City Federal Building in Birmingham, Alabama)
William H. Weston, Jr. (1890–1978), American mycologist
William Weston, character in Ecotopia
Bill Weston (1941–2012), British stuntman

See also
William Weston Patton (1821–1889), American abolitionist
William Weston Young (1776–1847), American Quaker entrepreneur